Sir George Dennis Gerea Lepping, GCMG MBE (22 November 1946 – 24 December 2014) served as the second Governor-General of the Solomon Islands from 7 July 1988 to 7 July 1994. Lepping was a native of the Shortland Islands of Western Province.

Biography

Lepping was appointed a Member of the Order of the British Empire in the 1981 New Year Honours for contribution to "public service and sport.

He was appointed Knight Grand Cross of the Order of St Michael and St George (GCMG) in 1988.

In March 2010, Sir George was appointed the Chairman of the 2012 Festival Pacific Arts Organising Committee.

Up until his death, he was a chairman of the Eminent Persons Advisory Council (EPAC) of the Solomon Islands Government's Constitutional Reform Unit.

He died at his residence in Honiara on Christmas Eve 2014, was a Catholic and in honour of him, a state funeral was held at the Holy Cross Cathedral in Honiara. He was laid to rest on his home island in the Shortland Islands.

References

External links
 Obituary 
 

Governors-General of Solomon Islands
Knights Grand Cross of the Order of St Michael and St George
Solomon Islands Roman Catholics
Members of the Order of the British Empire
People from the Western Province (Solomon Islands)
1946 births
2014 deaths